Arthur Pendragon is another name for King Arthur, a legendary British leader.

Arthur Pendragon may also refer to:

Arthur Uther Pendragon (born 1954), British activist and self-declared reincarnation of King Arthur
Arthur Pendragon (Merlin), a character in the TV series Merlin
Saber (Fate/stay night), or Artoria Pendragon, a character based on King Arthur in the Japanese visual novel Fate/stay night
Sir Arthur Pendragon, a character in video games produced by Ultimate Play the Game
Arthur Pendragon (Shrek), a character in the Shrek films

See also
 King Arthur (disambiguation)
 Pendragon (disambiguation)